Blake Anthony DeLong (born 1980) is an American film, television, and stage actor best known for originating the role of Andrey/Old Bolkonsky in the hit musical Natasha, Pierre, and the Great Comet of 1812. He played the lead role opposite James Hand in Matt Muir's film Thank You a Lot, which premiered on the opening night of SXSW Film Festival in 2014.  He is featured in Ava DuVernay's When They See Us on Netflix and played supporting roles in Spike Lee's 2018 film Pass Over, as well as Sister Aimee and Late Night, which both appeared at the Sundance Film Festival in 2019. He recently earned praise as axe murderer William Kemmler in the 2020 Sundance film Tesla, by Michael Almereyda. Notable stage work includes Othello at New York Theatre Workshop, a turn as David Amram in Illyria at The Public Theater, and the sixth Broadway revival of Death of a Salesman, opposite Wendell Pierce.

Personal life 
DeLong was born in Dallas, Texas and began acting in plays as a student at Lake Highlands High School. He met director Matt Muir in graduate school at the University of Texas at Austin, who cast him in his first film roles. DeLong's master's thesis was titled "Piece in progress" : writing, producing and performing a new play, "All of a piece".  After moving to New York City, DeLong worked odd jobs and starred in regional theater productions before booking commercials, Off-Broadway theater, television, and eventually, work in higher profile films. In 2021, he had a supporting role in the film The United States vs. Billie Holiday, directed by Lee Daniels.

Filmography

References

External links 
 

Living people
1980 births
American male stage actors
American male film actors
American male television actors
21st-century American male actors
Male actors from Dallas
University of Texas at Austin alumni